The 1801 United States Senate election in Pennsylvania was held on February 19, 1801. Peter Muhlenberg was elected by the Pennsylvania General Assembly to the United States Senate.

Results
Incumbent Federalist William Bingham, who was elected in 1795, was not a candidate for re-election to another term. The Pennsylvania General Assembly, consisting of the House of Representatives and the Senate, convened on February 19, 1801, to elect a new Senator to fill the term beginning on March 4, 1801. Two ballots were recorded. The results of the second and final ballot of both houses combined are as follows:

References

External links
Pennsylvania Election Statistics: 1682-2006 from the Wilkes University Election Statistics Project

1801
Pennsylvania
United States Senate
February 1801 events